Chase Vosvick (born July 28, 1998) is an American soccer player who currently plays as a goalkeeper for the Pittsburgh Riverhounds in the USL Championship.

Career

Youth
Vosvick attended Montverde Academy for high school, scoring back-to-back national championships with the team in 2016 and 2017.

College & Amateur
Vosvick began attending Loyola University Maryland in fall 2017, and made appearances in all five seasons that he attended the university. In his freshman season, he made 17 appearances with seven shutouts and was named the Patriot League Goalkeeper of the Year. Vosvick claimed the honor three additional times; in 2018 and in the spring and fall of 2021. In the spring of 2021, he was included on the MAC Hermann Trophy watch list.

Following his sophomore season, in the summer of 2019, Vosvick competed in USL League Two with the Brazos Valley Cavalry. He made 10 appearances for the club, tallying 68 saves.

Professional
Vosvick began training with the Pittsburgh Riverhounds prior to the 2022 season. In late February, Vosvick signed his first professional contract with the club; a one-year deal with an option to extend for 2023. He made his professional debut on March 12, 2022, registering a shutout in a 3–0 victory over Memphis 901.

References

External links
Chase Vosvick at Loyola University Maryland Athletics

1998 births
Living people
Loyola Greyhounds men's soccer players
Loyola University Maryland alumni
Brazos Valley Cavalry FC players
Pittsburgh Riverhounds SC players
USL League Two players
USL Championship players
Association football goalkeepers
Soccer players from Maryland
Montverde Academy alumni
American soccer players